Sin-Muballit was the father of Hammurabi and the fifth Amorite king of the first dynasty (the Amorite Dynasty) of Babylonia, reigning c. 1813-1792 or 1748-1729 BC (see Chronology of the Ancient Near East). He ruled over a relatively new and minor kingdom; however, he was the first ruler of Babylon to actually declare himself king of the city, and the first to expand the territory ruled by the city, and his son greatly expanded the Babylonian kingdom into the short lived Babylonian Empire.

Reign 
Sin-Muballit succeeded his father Apil-Sin. No inscriptions for either king are known.

In Sin-Muballlit's 13th year, he repelled the army of Larsa, which was frequently in conflict with Babylon. In the 17th year of his reign, Sin-Muballit took possession of the city of Isin and his power grew steadily over time as evidenced by his building and fortifying a number of towns. He abdicated due to failing health.

See also

List of Kings of Babylon

References

18th-century BC Babylonian kings
First dynasty of Babylon